Fanno may refer to:

 Fano (militia), sometimes spelt Fanno, an Amhara youth group in Ethiopia, perceived as either a protest movement or an armed militia
 Fanno Creek, a tributary of the Tualatin River in the U.S. state of Oregon
 Gino Girolamo Fanno (1882–1962), Italian mechanical engineer who developed the Fanno flow model
 Fanno flow

See also
 Fano (disambiguation)